Acme is the sixth studio album by Jon Spencer Blues Explosion. It was released via Matador Records on October 20, 1998.

A follow-up album was released the following year, featuring B-sides and remixes from Acme. It was released in two versions, Xtra-Acme USA and Acme Plus.

"Talk About the Blues" music video
In late 1998, a music video for the fifth track in the album, "Talk About the Blues", premiered on MTV. The video, directed by Evan Bernard, features movie actors Winona Ryder, Giovanni Ribisi and John C. Reilly as the Blues Explosion, with the actual band members acting in several scenes inspired by classic detective films.

Track listing

Charts

References

External links
 

1998 albums
Jon Spencer Blues Explosion albums
albums produced by Steve Albini
albums produced by Jim Dickinson
Matador Records albums
Capitol Records albums
Mute Records albums
Au Go Go Records albums